Cícero Moraes is a Brazilian 3D designer, whose work in open source programs like InVesalius, Blender and MakeHuman has become a reference in the field of forensic facial reconstruction in his country.

His best-known work is the facial reconstruction of St. Anthony of Padua, performed in partnership with the Centro Studi Antoniani (which works inside the Basilica of Saint Anthony of Padua), the Museum of Anthropology at the University of Padua, the Technology Center Renato Archer and the group of archaeological research Arc-Team. The work was done entirely with free software.

During the year 2013 he created 12 panels on facial reconstruction related to human evolution, these were presented in the exhibition "Faces of Evolution" at the Rosicrucian Egyptian Museum and in Curitiba, Brazil,. All images displayed on that exhibition were donated to the Wikimedia Commons and came to illustrate posts of important publications online linked to science.

In partnership with Rodolfo Melani, PhD and Paulo Eduardo Miamoto Dias, PhD at the Faculty of Dentistry at the University of São Paulo (FOUSP), Moraes wrote an article which describes the scanning techniques and facial reconstruction using only free software, and also participated in publications which describe the conversion of a video into a CT scan, presented at an international conference on computer graphics in Portugal. The partnership with Dr. Dias earned him two awards for best scientific poster at events of forensic dentistry and forensic anthropology at national and international level.

In August 2014, Moraes was awarded with an honorary degree from the City Council of Sinop, the Commendation Colonizer Enio Pipino, which was offered in honor of national and international projection provided to the city where he resides.

In February 2015, he performed 27 facial reconstructions, of which 22 were related to human evolution and 5 were related to historic people of the city of Padua. The reconstructions were presented at the exhibit "FACCE - i molti volti della storia umana" (FACES. The Many Visages of Human History), organized by the Museum of Anthropology at the University of Padova, the group of open archaeological research Arc-Team and the Association of Anthropologists Antrocom Onlus. Besides St. Anthony's facial reconstruction, he also reconstructed the historic faces of poet Francesco Petrarca, devotee Luca Belludi and scientist Giovanni Battista Morgagni.

Cícero Moraes was one of the main members of the Ebrafol, Brazilian Team of Forensic Anthropology and Odontology that reconstructed the face of Rose of Lima and Martin of Porres, in Peru. The designer worked in other projects of facial reconstruction with the Catholic Church.

On the Animal Avengers group, Moraes developed animal prosthetic based on 3D-printed technology. They saved a lot of animals that would otherwise have had to be put down, like a goose, a toucan, an aracari and a macaw.

The designer was responsible for reconstruction the skull and the face of Lord of Sipan, an ancient Moche leader, in Peru. A few months later the designer has reconstructed the face of the Czech "vampire" of Celakovice.

At the end of 2016, he worked in modeling human prosthesis with computer aid with experts at the University Paulista (UNIP) in São Paulo.

In an associated project with the Brazilian Academy of Hagiology (ABRHAGI), Cícero Moraes reconstructed the face of Saint Valentine, presented to the public on 13 February 2017.

References

External links 

   

1982 births
Living people
Brazilian designers
People from Chapecó
Forensic artists